Kempter is a German surname. Notable people with the surname include:

 Friederike Kempter (born 1979), German actress
 Lothar Kempter (1844–1918), German-Swiss composer and conductor
Susan Kempter, American violin teacher
Nathan Kempter, Great metal Worker/ Tomato Throwing
  (born 1983), German association football referee

German-language surnames